Bump! is a discontinued iOS and Android mobile app that enables smartphone users to transfer contact information, photos and files between devices. In 2011, it was #8 on Apple's list of all-time most popular free iPhone apps, and by February 2013 it had been downloaded 125 million times. Its developer, Bump Technologies, shut down the service and discontinued the app on January 31, 2014, after being acquired by Google for Google Photos and Android Camera.

Functionality
Bump sends contact information, photos and files to another device over the internet. Before activating the transfer, each user confirms what he or she wants to send to the other user. To initiate a transfer, two people physically bump their phones together. A screen appears on both users' smartphone displays, allowing them to confirm what they want to send to each other. When two users bump their phones, software on the phones send a variety of sensor data to an algorithm running on Bump servers, which includes the location of the phone, accelerometer readings, IP address, and other sensor readings. The algorithm figures out which two phones felt the same physical bump and then transfers the information between those phones. Bump makes transfers through software, in contrast to devices with Near Field Communication (NFC) chips, which transfer data through software and hardware.

With the February 2012 release of Bump 3.0 for iOS, the company took the unusual step of streamlining the app to focus on its most frequently used features: contact and photo sharing. Bump 3.0 for Android maintained the features eliminated from the iOS version but moved them behind swipeable layers.

In May 2012, a Bump update enabled users to transfer photos from their phone to their computer via a web service. To initiate a transfer, the user goes to the Bump website on their computer and bumps the smartphone on the computer keyboard's space bar. By December 2012, various Bump updates for iOS and Android had added the abilities to share video, audio, and any files. Users swipe to access those features.

In February 2013, an update to the Bump iOS and Android apps enabled users to transfer photos, videos, contacts and other files from a computer to a smartphone and vice versa via a web service.  To perform the transfer, users go to the Bump website on their computer and bump the smartphone on the computer keyboard's space bar.

Bump was listed among Time'''s "50 Best Android Applications for 2013".

History
The underlying idea of a synchronous gesture like bumping two devices for content transfer or pairing them was first conceived by Ken Hinkley of Microsoft Research in 2003. This idea was presented at a user interface and technology conference that same year. The paper proposed the use of accelerometers and a bumping gesture of two devices to enable communication, screen sharing and content transfer between them. Similar to this original concept, the idea for Bump app was conceived by David Lieb, a former employee of Texas Instruments, while he was attending the University of Chicago Booth School of Business for his MBA. While going through the orientation and meeting process of business school, he became frustrated by constantly entering contact information into his iPhone and felt that the process could be improved. His fellow Texas Instruments employees Andy Huibers and Jake Mintz, who was a classmate of Lieb's at the University of Chicago's MBA program, joined Lieb to form Bump Technologies.

Bump Technologies launched in 2008 and is located in Mountain View, Calif. Early funding for the project was provided by startup incubator Y Combinator, Sequoia Capital and other angel investors. It gained attention at the CTIA international wireless conference, due to its accessibility and novelty factor. In October 2009, Bump received $3.4m in Series A funding followed in January 2011 with a $16m series B financing round led by Andreessen Horowitz. Silicon Valley venture capitalist Marc Andreessen sits on the company's board.

The Bump app debuted in the Apple iOS App Store in March 2009 and was “one of the apps that helped to define the iPhone” (Harry McCracken, Technologizer). It soon became the billionth download on Apple's App Store. An Android version launched in November 2009. By the time Bump 3.0 for iOS was released in February 2012, the app had been installed 77 million times, with users sharing more than 2 million photos daily. As of February 2013, there had been 125 million Bump app downloads.

Other apps created by Bump Technologies
Bump Technologies worked with PayPal in March 2010 to create a PayPal iPhone application. The application, which allows two users to automatically activate an Internet transfer of money between their accounts, found widespread adoption. A similar version was released for Android in August 2010.

The Bump capability in PayPal's apps was removed in March 2012. At that time, Bump Technologies released Bump Pay, an iOS app that lets users transfer money via PayPal by physically bumping two smartphones together. The tool was originally created for the Bump team to use when splitting up restaurant bills. The payment feature was not added to the Bump app because the company “wanted to make it as simple as possible so people understand how this works,” Lieb told ABC News. Bump Pay was the first app from the company's Bump Labs initiative. A goal of Bump Labs is to test new app ideas that may not fit within the main Bump app.

ING Direct added a feature to its iPhone app in 2011 that lets users transfer money to each other using Bump's technology. The feature was later added to its Android app, now called Capital One 360.

In July 2012, Bump Technologies released Flock, an iPhone photo sharing app.   An Android version was released in December 2012. Using geolocation data embedded in photos and a user's Facebook connections, Flock finds pictures the user takes while out with friends and family and puts everyone's photos from that event into a single shared album. Users receive a push notification after the event, asking if they want to share their photos with friends who were there in the moment. The app will also scan previous photos in the iPhone camera roll and uncover photos that have yet to be shared. If location services were enabled at the time a photo was taken, Flock allows users to create an album of photos from the past with the friends who were there with them.

Vision for the future of mobile
Bump Technologies CEO David Lieb has said technology is evolving to a point where users don't have to make their phones transfer information to others; it will just happen. Lieb said:

"Where I see the whole mobile world moving in the next year or two is from the ‘Age of Intent,’ where we’ve been for the last 40 years, to the ‘Age of Inference’ or the ‘Age of Context.’"

The next generation of mobile apps, Lieb believes, will “solve problems in a way that the user, the customer, doesn’t even have to think about it.”

"Mobile will enable all of these apps to kind of flip, and instead of me telling the app what I want it to do, the app will suggest to me, 'Hey, you might want to leave for your meeting down at the end of the strip because there's a lot of traffic.'"

Lieb used Flock as an example of mobile apps that will do what the user wants in the background, with little or no effort on their part.

Acquisition by Google
On September 16, 2013, Bump Technologies announced that it had been acquired by Google. On December 31, 2013, they broke the news that both Bump and Flock would be discontinued so that the team could focus on new projects at Google. The apps were removed from the App Store and Google Play on January 31, 2014. The company subsequently deleted all user data and shut down their servers, thus rendering existing installations of the apps inoperable.

Awards
Bump Technologies received an Emerging Technology Award in 2010 from the San Jose/Silicon Valley Business Journal for the “mobile” category. Bump was named Best Overall Consumer App on TiE50's Top 50 Startups list for 2011. Lieb and Mintz were named to Bloomberg Businessweek’s Best Young Tech Entrepreneurs of 2011, and Mintz made Forbes'' 2011 30 Under 30.   In 2012, Bump Technologies was named to the Fast Company Top 50 Most Innovative Companies.

See also
 Android Beam

References

IOS software
Android (operating system) software
Google acquisitions
Discontinued Google acquisitions